Williams Township is the name of some places in the U.S. state of Pennsylvania:

Williams Township, Dauphin County, Pennsylvania
Williams Township, Northampton County, Pennsylvania

Pennsylvania township disambiguation pages